Jasper "Fang" Warren (born 13 September 1989) is an Australian sailor. 

Together with teammate  Steven Thomas, Warren became the 2008 World Champion in the 29er boat by finishing in front of fellow Australians Byron White and William Ryan.

Career highlights
World Championships
2008 - Sorrento,  1st, 29er (with Steven Thomas)
Warren is widely regarded as a battler.

External links 
 
 
 

1989 births
Living people
Australian male sailors (sport)
29er class world champions
World champions in sailing for Australia